Senator Constantine may refer to:

Dow Constantine (born 1961), Washington State Senate
Lee Constantine (born 1952), Florida State Senate